Antonio Šančić and Nino Serdarušić were the defending champions but chose not to defend their title.

Vladyslav Manafov and Oleg Prihodko won the title after defeating Fabian Fallert and Hendrik Jebens 6–3, 6–4 in the final.

Seeds

Draw

References

External links
 Main draw

Banja Luka Challenger - Doubles
2022 Doubles